Barron High School is a public high school located in Barron, Wisconsin. It serves students in groups 9 through 12 and has a student body of 424 students as of the 2018-2019 school year. BHS' athletic teams are known as the Golden Bears.

History
The first recorded instance of a four-year high school in Barron was 1895.

Demographics
Barron is 79 percent white, 13 percent black, five percent Hispanic, two percent Asian and one percent Native American.

Athletics
Barron High School has a nine-hole disc golf course that wraps around the school's other athletic fields. The Golden Bears compete in the Heart O'North Conference.

E-Day
Every year, Barron High School participates in E-Day, also known as Environmental Day. On Wednesday, May 7, 2014, over 350 of the high school students took time away from their studies to help clean up around the community. More than 20 volunteer projects were planned for the event. These activities change every year and some of these include cleaning up at the Pioneer Village Museum, painting picnic tables, cleaning park grounds, maintenance work at city parks, helping out at the local humane society, and doing work around the school. E-day gives students the opportunity to gain community service experience, work together, and gives them a chance to help the environment. A local phone company called Mosaic Telecom supports the project by donating t-shirts to all the students who participate in the E-Day program.

References

External links
Official Site
Mosaic Telecom Blog
Pioneer Village Museum Official Site

Public high schools in Wisconsin
Education in Barron County, Wisconsin